Lake Westwood is a  glacial lake in the Tyndalls peaks to the east of  Mount Read, in the West Coast Range, West Coast of Tasmania.

The features that separate the lakes are:

 Anthony Road and Lake Selina (516m) is open ground
 Lake Selina and Lake Westwood are separated by Moyle Rock (696m)
 Lake Westwood and Lake Julia are separated by Lukes Knob (719m)
 south of Lake Westwood is Julia Peak (918m) which is heavily forested on the south side

See also

List of reservoirs and dams in Tasmania
List of lakes in Tasmania
List of glacial lakes in Australia

References

Further reading

Westwood, Lake
Westwood, Lake
Westwood